With its four national languages, its cultural diversity and economical status, Switzerland has long had one of the best developed and most complete mass media sectors in Europe.

Still, due to its small territorial size, it is strongly influenced by the media of larger bordering countries, with foreign journals, radios and televisions popular throughout the country.
The broadcasting sector is dominated by the SRG SSR, subsidized by the federal government, while the printed press is free of governmental involvement.

Switzerland was ranked tenth in 2021 in the annual "Worldwide press freedom ranking of countries" published by Reporters Without Borders.

Print

Radio

Television

Internet
 Swissinfo (swissinfo.ch) is a ten-language news and information platform produced by the Swiss Broadcasting Corporation.
SWITCH Information Technology Services
Swiss Internet Exchange
Swiss Media
Swiss media company based in Switzerland
www.switzerlandinsound.com English-Language audio features

Controversies

Freedom of press

Since leaking financial data is a criminal offense in Switzerland (even if it is in the public interest)  punishable with up to five years in jail, Swiss media argued in February 2022 that the banking secrecy law runs contrary to freedom of speech and freedom of the press in some cases. In 2022, the United Nations Human Rights Council has asked for a better protection of journalists and whistleblowers in this regard.

See also
 Journalism in Switzerland (in German)

Bibliography

External links

References

 
Switzerland
Switzerland